Victor Lonell Hicks (born January 19, 1957) is a former American football tight end who played one season with the Los Angeles Rams of the National Football League. He was drafted by the Los Angeles Rams in the fifth round of the 1979 NFL Draft. He played college football at the University of Oklahoma and attended Estacado High School in Lubbock, Texas. He was also member of the New Jersey Generals and Denver Gold of the United States Football League.

References

External links
Just Sports Stats
College stats

Living people
1957 births
Players of American football from Texas
American football tight ends
African-American players of American football
Oklahoma Sooners football players
Los Angeles Rams players
New Jersey Generals players
Denver Gold players
People from Lubbock, Texas
21st-century African-American people
20th-century African-American sportspeople